The 728th Air Control Squadron is an inactive United States Air Force unit. It was last assigned to the 552d Air Control Group, 552d Air Control Wing. It was inactivated on 17 May 2013. 
  
From 1950 to 2013, the unit was a Control and Reporting Center.

History
The squadron was activated by the Ninth Air Force commander on 2 September 1950 at Turner Air Force Base, Georgia. The unit, originally designated 728th Aircraft Control and Warning Squadron was stationed at Pope Air Force Base, North Carolina on 2 November 1950 followed by a move to Donaldson Air Force Base, South Carolina on 16 January 1954. On 12 June 1956, the squadron was stationed at Shaw Air Force Base, South Carolina.  In the early 1960s, as Army airborne units were training for deployment to Vietnam, Detachment 1 of the 728th TCS operated out of a field deployment on Fort Bragg and set up mobile communications systems for Army field exercises.  This detachment moved from Fort Bragg to McCoy Air Force Base, Florida in 1965 and was involved in providing radio relay communications for the Inter-American Peace Force at San Isidro AB in the Dominican Republic.  The detachment relocated to Myrtle Beach Air Force Base, South Carolina in 1967 as a detachment out of Shaw AFB. The 728th, in those days, was an element of the Air Force Tactical Air Command and supported the Composite Air Strike Force (CASF). The Detachment at Myrtle Beach AFB (Det 1, 728th TCS) stood down in 1969 and personnel were sent to Tactical Control Squadrons at Cannon AFB, Eglin AFB, Bergstrom AFB and other bases.  The 728th moved to Eglin Air Force Base Auxiliary Field No. 3 (Duke Field) on 15 August 1977 as a tenant unit. The squadron was finally relocated to Eglin Air Force Base proper on 5 June 1994 under the 33d Fighter Wing.

Emblem

Description/Blazon
On a disc parted per pale Celeste and Azure, issuing from base a demi-globe parted per pale of the field counter changed, gridlined Sable, supporting a stylized bat parted per pale of the third and Argent counter changed, his eyes as a radar of the fourth detailed of the third, langued Gules, in chief two lightning bolts Or; all within a narrow Black border.

Attached above the disc, a Yellow scroll edged with a narrow Black border and inscribed "POISED FOR PEACE" in Black letters.

Attached below the disc, a Yellow scroll edged with a narrow Black border and inscribed "728TH AIR CONTROL SQ" in Black letters.

Emblem significance
Ultramarine blue and Air Force yellow are the Air Force colors.  Blue alludes to the sky, the primary theater of Air Force operations.  Yellow refers to the sun and the excellence required of Air Force personnel.  The two colors of the field represent day and night operations.  The counterchanged globe symbolizes fair and foul weather.  The counterchanged stylized bat signifies battle management functions of theater air defense during night and day, data link management, surveillance, identification and air battle execution.  The bat's radar eyes represent the means to search the sky to accomplish tactical unit functions.  The lightning bolts symbolize the high speed exchange of combat communications and fused data crucial to joint tactical operations.

Awards and activities
Since the squadron's creation, the 728th has received six Air Force Outstanding Unit Awards; with one Valor device for Desert Storm and has participated in several major command, U.S. Readiness Command and Joint Chiefs of Staff directed exercises and deployments throughout the world. During Operations Desert Shield/Storm, the 728th fulfilled a vital role in the coalition effort while they were deployed to King Kalid Military City (KKMC), Saudi Arabia. The 728th also participated in Operation Deny Flight, the suppression of flight activities over Bosnia, while deployed to Mt Jacotenente, Italy. Additionally, the 728th is known for its significant contribution to the fight against illegal narcotics in Central and South America and for supporting an ongoing rotation to Kuwait as part of Operation Desert Calm. They also have been deployed six times to Iraq to support Operation Iraqi Freedom.

With the impending transition of the 33d Fighter Wing from an Air Combat Command unit operating the F-15 Eagle to an Air Education and Training Command unit operating the F-35 Lightning II, as well as a push to consolidate all stateside Control and Reporting Centers under one Wing, on 1 May 2008 the 728th Air Control Squadron was moved underneath the newly activated 552d Air Control Group at Tinker Air Force Base, Oklahoma along with the 607th Air Control Squadron at Luke Air Force Base, the 726th Air Control Squadron at Mountain Home Air Force Base, and the 729th Air Control Squadron at Hill Air Force Base.  The 552d Air Control Group's parent wing is the 552d Air Control Wing also at Tinker Air Force Base which also operates the majority of the USAF's fleet of E-3B/C Sentry AWACS aircraft.  The resulting Wing consolidated all ACC tactical command and control and air Battle Management capabilities under one parent organization allowing for continuity amongst CRCs.

Previously, the 728th Air Control Squadron was part of the Twelfth Air Force, 552d Air Control Wing at Eglin Air Force Base, Florida, and was always poised and ready to provide a Control and Reporting Center in support of tactical air operations throughout the world.

Past Commanders

References

Sources
http://ageranger.com/728ACS.htm
http://www.33fw.acc.af.mil/library/factsheets/factsheet.asp?id=4390
https://web.archive.org/web/20070205154227/http://www.33fw.acc.af.mil/

728